Avital Leibovich (Hebrew: אביטל ליבוביץ) is the Director of the American Jewish Committee (AJC) in Israel.

Education
Leibovich graduated with a BA in English Literature and Political Science from Bar Ilan University in 1992, and received a MA in International Relations from University of Haifa in 1998; she also received a diploma in Spokesmanship, Communications, and Public Relations from the Department of Foreign Affairs at Bar Ilan University in 2002.

Career prior to AJC
Leibovich served for 22 years  in the Israel Defense Forces, achieving the rank of lieutenant colonel, and holding  a wide range of senior media and public relations positions within the Defense Forces.

Her most recent role was Head of the Interactive Media Branch of the IDF Spokesperson's Unit, a branch which she created as a response to the growing importance of social networks and internet platforms as   media.

Leibovich also held the position of Head of the Foreign Press Branch, acquiring over seven years of expertise working with Foreign Media, and establishing strong connections between the IDF and more traditional International Media in many languages.

See also

 American Jewish Committee
 IDF Spokesperson's Unit
 Israel Defense Forces
 Military of Israel
 State of Israel

References

1971 births
Living people
Israeli activists
Israeli women activists
Israeli Jews
People from Tel Aviv
Women in 21st-century warfare
Israeli female military personnel
Bar-Ilan University alumni
American Jewish Committee
Jewish women activists
Israeli colonels